Strappado is a form of torture.

Strappado may also refer to:

 Strappado bondage, a related technique in BDSM play
Strappado, a 1986 album by Slaughter (Canadian band)
"Strappado", track on 2000 album Instruments of Torture by Brodequin
"Strappado", a 2009 short story by Laird Barron

See also
A Strappado for the Divell, a satirical work by Richard Brathwait ((1588–1673)